Hottentot (British and South African English ) is a term that was historically used to refer to the Khoekhoe, indigenous nomadic pastoralists of South Africa.

The term has also been used to refer to the non-Bantu-speaking indigenous population as a whole, now collectively known as the Khoisan. Use of the term Hottentot is now deprecated and is offensive, the preferred name for the non-Bantu speaking indigenous people of the Western Cape area being Khoi, Khoekhoe (formerly Khoikhoi).

Etymology 
Hottentot originated among the "old Dutch" settlers of the Dutch Cape Colony run by United East India Company (VOC), who arrived in the region in the 1650s, and it entered English usage from Dutch in the seventeenth century. However, no definitive Dutch etymology for the term is known. A widely claimed etymology is from a supposed Dutch expression equivalent to "stammerer, stutterer", applied to the Khoikhoi on account of the distinctive click consonants in their languages. There is, however, no earlier attestation of a word hottentot to support this theory. An alternative possibility is that the name derived from an overheard term in chants accompanying Khoikhoi or San dances, but seventeenth-century transcriptions of such chants offer no conclusive evidence for this.

An early Anglicisation of the term is recorded as hodmandod in the years around 1700. The reduced Afrikaans/Dutch form hotnot has also been borrowed into South African English as a derogatory term for black people, including Cape Coloureds.

Usage as an ethnic term 
In seventeenth-century Dutch, Hottentot was at times used to denote all black people (synonymously with Kaffir), but at least some speakers were careful to use the term Hottentot to denote what they thought of as a race distinct from the supposedly darker-skinned people referred to as Kaffirs, but the term Kaffir was also used against Cape Coloureds and Khoisans. This distinction between the non-Bantu "Cape Blacks" or "Cape Coloureds" and the Bantu was noted as early as 1684 by the French anthropologist François Bernier. The idea that Hottentot referred strictly to the non-Bantu peoples of southern Africa was well embedded in colonial scholarly thought by the end of the eighteenth century.

The main meaning of Hottentot as an ethnic term in the 19th and the 20th centuries has therefore been to denote the Khoikhoi people specifically. However, Hottentot also continued to be used through the eighteenth, nineteenth, and twentieth centuries in a wider sense, to include all of the people now usually referred to with the modern term Khoisan (not only the Khoikhoi, but also the San people, hunter-gatherer populations from the interior of southern Africa who had not been known to the seventeenth-century settlers, once often referred to as Bosjesmans in Dutch and Bushmen in English).

In George Murdock's Atlas of World Cultures (1981), the author refers to "Hottentots" as a "subfamily of the Khoisan linguistic family" who "became detribalized in contact with Dutch settlers in 1652, mixing with the latter and with slaves brought by them from Indonesia to form the hybrid population known today as the Cape Coloured." The term Hottentot remained in use as a technical ethnic term in anthropological and historiographical literature into the late 1980s. The 1996 edition of the Dictionary of South African English merely says that "the word 'Hottentot' is seen by some as offensive and Khoikhoi is sometimes substituted as a name for the people, particularly in scholarly contexts". Yet, by the 1980s, because of the racist connotations discussed below, it was increasingly seen as too derogatory and offensive to be used in an ethnic sense.

Usage as a term of abuse and racist connotations 
From the eighteenth century onwards, the term hottentot was also a term of abuse without a specific ethnic sense, comparable to barbarian or cannibal. In its ethnic sense, it had developed its connotations of savagery and primitivism by the seventeenth century; colonial depictions of the Hottentots (Khoikhoi) in the seventeenth to eighteenth century were characterized by savagery, often suggestive of cannibalism or the consumption of raw flesh, physiological features such as steatopygia and elongated labia perceived as primitive or "simian" and a perception of the click sounds in the Khoikhoi languages as "bestial". Thus, it can be said that the European, colonial image of "the Hottentot" from the seventeenth century onwards bore little relation to any realities of the Khoisan in Africa, and that this image fed into the usage of hottentot as a generalised derogatory term. Correspondingly, the word is "sometimes used as ugly slang for a black person".

Use of the derived term hotnot was explicitly proscribed in South Africa by 2008. Accordingly, much recent scholarship on the history of colonial attitudes to the Khoisan or on the European trope of "the Hottentot" puts the term Hottentot in scare quotes.

Other usages 
In its original role of ethnic designator, the term Hottentot was included into a variety of derived terms, such as  the Hottentot Corps, the first Coloured unit to be formed in the South African army, originally called the Corps Bastaard Hottentoten (Dutch: "Corps of Bastard Hottentots"), organised in 1781 by the Dutch colonial administration of the time.

The word is also used in the common names of a wide variety of plants and animals, such as the Africanis dogs sometimes called "Hottentot hunting dogs", the fish Pachymetopon blochii, frequently simply called hottentots, Carpobrotus edulis, commonly known as a "hottentot-fig", and Trachyandra, commonly known as "hottentot cabbage". It has also given rise to the scientific name for one genus of scorpion, Hottentotta, and may be the origin of the epithet tottum in the botanical name Leucospermum tottum.

The word is still used as part of a tongue-twister in modern Dutch, "Hottentottententententoonstelling", meaning a "Hottentot tent exhibition".

In Danish the word is used to designate a person with a lot of energy, usually in connection to small children exhibiting frenzied behaviour, and is not generally considered to be a racial term.

In the 1939 film The Wizard of Oz, the Cowardly Lion, blustering about his lack of courage, says: "What makes the Hottentot so hot? What puts the 'ape' in apricot? What have they got that I ain't got?" Other cast members reply: "Courage."

In the 1964 film Mary Poppins, Admiral Boom mistakes the rooftop-dancing chimney sweeps for an attack by 'Hottentots'.

Tom Lehrer's song "We Will All Go Together When We Go" refers to both "Hottentots and Eskimos" going at the same time.

See also

Hottentot Venus
The Hottentot (1922 film)
Terre Haute Hottentots

References

 François-Xavier Fauvelle-Aymar, L'invention du Hottentot: histoire du regard occidental sur les Khoisan (XVe-XIXe siècle) (Paris: Publications de la Sorbonne, 2002)
 Linda Evi Merians, Envisioning the Worst: Representations of "Hottentots" in Early-modern England (Newark: University of Delaware Press, 2001)

Anti-African and anti-black slurs
Anti-black racism in South Africa
Khoikhoi
South African English